Aalesunds Turnforening is a Norwegian gymnastics club from Ålesund, founded on 27 November 1887.

Three Olympic gymnasts have represented the club: Wilhelm Steffensen, Herman Helgesen and Alf Aanning, who all became silver medalists in 1920.

References

 Official site 

Sport in Ålesund
Sports clubs established in 1887
1887 establishments in Norway
Gymnastics clubs in Norway